"High Times" is a song by British funk/acid jazz band Jamiroquai, released as the fourth and final single from their third studio album, Travelling Without Moving (1996). Released on 1 December 1997, the song peaked at number 20 on the UK Singles Chart, and reached the top 10 on both the American and Canadian dance charts.

Background
The song was written by Jason Kay. The song begins with the quote "You don't need a name in bright lights, you're a rock star. In some tinfoil, with a glass pipe, is your guitar." This refers to crack cocaine. Cocaine and many other drugs are referenced in the song, all in a negative light, but it is jet lag that is the main reference during the chorus: "Last night, turned to daylight, and a minute became a day", a desynchronosis that is often caused when travelling around the world during the tours. The radio edit of the song is widely ridiculed among fan circles for its poor editing. There are some abrupt cuts in the song, and some words are cut out in an odd manner, such as the word "this" from the "This twisted, crystal kingdom" line. The Radio Edit was featured on the group's greatest hits compilation, High Times: Singles 1992-2006. Some releases of Travelling Without Moving include a version of the song without the sample "Last Night Changed It All" as sung by Esther Williams and written by Joe Wheeler.

Critical reception
Larry Flick from Billboard wrote, "If you're a fan Jamiroquai's recent MTV hits, ya ain't heard nothin' yet. "High Times" shows the band 
at its funky best. The track jiggles with a classic soul sound, juiced with enough electronic flavor to keep it from sounding quaint. Frontman Jay Kay has perfected his Stevie Wonder inflections while also honing an individual style that demands to be heard in a live setting."

Music video
The accompanying music video for "High Times" is filmed like a documentary with an inexpensive digital camera by the band manager of the band during the Latin American tour. In the video, the group is shown landing in a city airport, happy and excited. The remainder of the video shows candid scenes of Jamiroquai laughing at jokes, television, and having general fun. Chilean fans appreciated this music video for lead singer Jay Kay's cultural jacket throughout the video. The last few seconds were censored in some countries due to the usage of cannabis.

Track listing

 UK CD single
 "High Times (Radio Edit)" – 4:08
 "High Times (Bionic Supachronic Mix)" – 8:38
 "High Times (Doobie Dub)" – 6:46
 "High Times (Album Version)" – 5:57

 UK 12" single
 "High Times (Bionic Supachronic Mix)" – 8:38
 "High Times (Jamiroquai Mix)" – 4:00
 "High Times (Doobie Dub)" – 6:46
 "High Times (Jamiroquai Dub)" – 5:30

Charts

Weekly charts

Year-end charts

References

1996 songs
1997 singles
Jamiroquai songs
Songs about drugs
Songs written by Jason Kay
Songs written by Stuart Zender
Songs written by Toby Smith
S2 Records singles